Howard Gilbert McNeil (October 24, 1920 – November 27, 2010) was a meteorologist in Dallas/Ft. Worth, Texas, United States, for more than twenty years from the mid-1950s to the mid-1970s.  He was affectionately known throughout the Southwest as "The Old Weatherbird" because his broadcasts were seen all over the region as part of the regular programming at the superstation KFJZ, Channel 11.

References 

1920 births
American meteorologists
Military personnel from Chicago
United States Air Force officers
University of Denver alumni
2010 deaths